Université de Moncton Faculty of Law is one of only two law schools in the world offering a common law legal education taught entirely in French, the other being the University of Ottawa Faculty of Law.

History

The Faculty was established in 1978 in order to respond to the needs of the people of New Brunswick, as well as other Canadians preferring a francophone education in common law. As a bilingual province, both constitutionally and in practice, New Brunswick is home to a francophone population who follow the common law tradition, unlike Quebec, which is governed by the Civil Code of Quebec. New-Brunswick students therefore require a school that prepares them for the practice of law in other parts of Canada.

The Honourable Michel Bastarache, former Puisne Justice on the Supreme Court of Canada, served as one of the first deans of the faculty.

Admission 

The Faculty admits students on the basis of their GPA, extracurricular activities, interview, questionnaire, as well as letters of reference. As classes are conducted entirely in French, proficiency in French is required. Like other francophone law schools in Canada, the Université de Moncton does not require that its students take the LSAT, although it does consider the LSAT score if provided.

Degrees offered 

The Université de Moncton offers both the basic J.D. (formerly LL.B.) and the graduate LL.M. The faculty also offers joint degrees: the J.D.-MBA (Masters of Business), J.D.-MAP (Masters in Public Administration) and J.D.-MEE (Maitrise en études de l'environnement/Masters of Environmental Studies). In addition, students who already possess a civil law degree (an LL.L. or a B.C.L.) from a Canadian school can enroll at the Université de Moncton for two semesters to complete a J.D. Lastly, the Faculty offers a D.E.C.L. (Diplôme d'études en common law) for international students seeking an understanding of the common law tradition.

Notable faculty 

 James E. Lockyer, Former Minister of Justice of New Brunswick
 Serge Rousselle, Former Minister of Education and Early Childhood Development, and Attorney General of New Brunswick

Notable alumni 
 Bernard Lord, Former Premier of New Brunswick  
 Brian Gallant, Former Premier of New Brunswick
 J.P. Barry, NHL Player Agent

References

Moncton
Université de Moncton